Mack is a given name and nickname. Notable people with the name include:

Given name
Mack Beggs (born 1999), American high school wrestler
 Mack Brown (born 1951), head coach of the University of Texas at Austin Longhorn football team
 Mack Brown (running back) (born 1991), American football player
 Mack C. Chase (born 1931), American oil and natural gas tycoon
 Mack Calvin (born 1947), American former basketball player
 Mack Charles Parker (1936–1959), African-American victim of lynching in the US
 Mack David (1912–1993), American lyricist and songwriter
 Mack Herron (born 1948), American former football running back
 Mack Hollins (born 1993), American football player
 Mack Jones (1938–2004), American Major League Baseball player
 Mack Lee Hill (1940–1965), American college and professional football player
 Mack Mitchell (born 1952), American former football player
 Mack Ray Edwards (1918–1971), American child sex abuser/serial killer; committed suicide by hanging in his prison cell.
 Mack Wilson (born 1998), American football player

Nickname
 Johnny Mack Brown (1904–1974), American actor and football player
 Mack Flenniken, American football player, coach, and sports figure
 Mack McCarthy, former head college basketball coach for East Carolina University
 Mack Miller, American former cross-country skier and trainer Andrew Markley (born 1931)

Stage name
 Mack Gordon (1904–1959), American composer and lyricist of songs for stage and film, born Morris Gittler
 Mack Sennett (1880-1960), Canadian director and actor born Michael Sinnott
 Mack Swain (1876–1935), American actor and vaudevillian born Moroni Swain

Fictional characters
Mack (Cars), an anthropomorphic semi-trailer truck from the film Cars, based on a Mack truck
Mack, the boss who held the first Star Piece in Super Mario RPG: Legend of the Seven Stars
Mack the Knife, the eponymous serial killer in the song Mack the Knife

See also
Mac (nickname)

Lists of people by nickname